This is the discography of French singer-songwriter and harpist Cécile Corbel. It consists of five studio albums, three compilation albums, three soundtrack albums, an extended play, and at least three singles. She has also participated in two cast recordings and various other albums.

Albums

Studio albums

Compilation albums

EPs

Singles

Soundtracks

Cast recordings

Music videos

References

Discographies of French artists